James Foulis (1871–1928) was a Scottish-American golfer who won the second U.S. Open in 1896.

James Foulis may also refer to:

Jim Foulis (1903–1969), American golfer, nephew of the 1896 U.S. Open winner
James Foulis (judge) (died 1549), Scottish judge
Sir James Foulis, 2nd Baronet (died 1688), Scottish judge
 Sir James Foulis, 3rd Baronet (1645–1711), Scottish judge
Sir James Foulis, 4th Baronet (died 1742), of the Foulis baronets
Sir James Foulis, 5th Baronet (1714–1791), antiquarian
Sir James Foulis, 6th Baronet (died 1825), of the Foulis baronets
Sir James Foulis, 7th Baronet (1770–1842)